The Magic of the Blue is the second album by American soul group Blue Magic, produced by Norman Harris and Bobby Eli and released in 1974 on the Atco label.

History
The album was recorded at Sigma Sound Studios in Philadelphia and features Sigma's famous house band MFSB.  The Magic of the Blue received a similar favorable critical reception to its predecessor Blue Magic, although its lead single "Three Ring Circus" was regarded as an obvious attempt to produce "Sideshow" Part 2. The album peaked at #14 on the R&B chart and #71 on the pop chart. It was reissued by Rhino Records in 2006, but unlike the same company's Blue Magic reissue, did not include any bonus tracks.

Track listing

Personnel
Blue Magic
Vernon Sawyer, Richard Pratt, Keith Beaton, Wendell Sawyer, Ted Mills

Musicians
Bobby Eli, Roland Chambers, Norman Harris, Tony Bell – guitars
Ted Mills, Ron Kersey, Cotton Kent – pianos
Rusty Jackmon, Ron Baker, Bob Babbitt – bass
Earl Young, Charles Collins, John Nero – drums
Larry Washington – congas
Vince Montana – vibraphone
T. Life – harmonica solo on "Three Ring Circus"
Don Renaldo and his Strings and Horns – strings & horns accompaniment
Ted Mills – sound effects on "Looking for a Friend"

Production
Norman Harris, Bobby Eli – producers, arrangement
Alan Rubens, Steven Bernstein, Bruce Gable – executive producers
Carl Paruolo, Joe Tarsia, Kenny Present, Don Murray, Jay Mark – recording engineers
Ron Kersey, Vince Montana, Jack Faith, – arrangement
Carl Helm, Phil Hurtt, Bunny Sigler, Barbara Ingram, Evette Benton, Carla Benson, Ted Mills, Wendall Sawyer, Darryl Grant – vocal arrangement

Charts

Singles

References

External links
 

1974 albums
Blue Magic (band) albums
Albums produced by Norman Harris
Albums recorded at Sigma Sound Studios
Atco Records albums